Goose flight or Goose migration is a paleontological site and natural monument in Pavlodar, Kazakhstan, on the eastern shore of the river Irtysh. It is one of Eurasia's largest burials of Hipparion fauna. Fossils of more than 60 species were found, including Chilotherium, Samotherium, Machairodus, and Lagomeryx.

It was discovered in 1928 by paleontologist Yuri Alexandrovich Orlov. After coming to Pavlodar, Orlov took notice of geological formations of the Neogene period. It was strewn with fragments of bones, jaws, and scattered mammal teeth. It was decided to do a trial excavation that later presented promising results, samples from it were sent via railway. Since then multiple digs have been done: first by the Paleontological Institute in 1929 and 1930, then by the Kazakhstan Academy of Sciences.

The issue of its conservation was raised as early as 1956, and plans of its museumification were proposed since then. It was put under state protection in 1971. An open-air museum was opened at its place in 2019, with the site itself being conserved.

References 

Paleontology in Kazakhstan
Paleontological sites
Pavlodar Region